A dohyō is the space in which a sumo wrestling bout occurs. A typical dohyō is a circle made of partially buried rice-straw bales 4.55 meters in diameter. In official professional tournaments (honbasho), it is mounted on a square platform of clay 66 cm high and 6.7m wide on each side.

Configuration and construction

In professional sumo, a new dohyō is built prior to each tournament by the yobidashi (ring attendants), who are responsible for this activity. The process of building the dohyō and its 66 cm high platform takes three days and is done with traditional tools. The clay used is taken from the banks of the Arakawa River in Saitama Prefecture. However, due to growing urbanization, clay from Ibaraki Prefecture has started to be used. The surface is covered by sand. The dohyō is removed after each tournament and, in the case of Nagoya, pieces are taken home by the fans as souvenirs. The yobidashi also build the dohyō for training stables and sumo touring events.

The diameter of the ring is 15 shaku (4.55 meters), which increased from 13 shaku (3.94 meters) in 1931. The rice-straw bales (tawara (俵)) which form the ring are one third standard size and are partially buried in the clay of the dohyō. Four of the tawara are placed slightly outside the line of the circle at the four cardinal directions, these are called privileged bales (tokudawara). Originally, this was to allow rain to run off the surface, when sumo tournaments were held outdoors in the open. Today, a wrestler under pressure at the edge of the ring will often try to move himself round to one of these points to gain leverage in order to push back more effectively against the opponent who is trying to force him out.

First introduced in the spring tournament of 1928, they are painted 90 cm long, 6 cm wide and 70 cm apart. The shikiri-sen are touched up by yobidashi at the end of each day with white enamel paint. The painted lines are notably slicker than the surrounding dirt, but rarely cause a wrestler to slip due to their narrowness. Around the ring is finely brushed sand called the ja-no-me (蛇の目, snake's eye), which can be used to determine if a wrestler has just touched his foot, or another part of his body, outside the ring. The yobidashi ensure this is clean of any previous marks immediately prior to each bout.

A roof resembling that of a Shinto shrine (which has been of the Shinmei-zukuri style since the May 1953 tournament) is suspended above the dohyō, called the tsuriyane. The roof weighs 6.25 tons and is supported by cables that can hold up to 30 tons. Around the tsuriyane hangs a purple banner which is embroidered with the Japan Sumo Association's mon. Prior to the September 1952 tournament the tsuriyane had been supported by columns, but they were removed to allow fans an uninterrupted view of the dohyō. Colored tassels (fusa), which replaced the colored columns, are suspended from the corners. They represent the four seasons and the four spirits of directions:

Green – Azure Dragon of the East (青龍), Spring 
Red – Vermilion Bird of the South (朱雀), Summer
White – White Tiger of the West (白虎), Fall
Black – Black Tortoise of the North (玄武), Winter

The dohyō in training stables is not raised but is otherwise the same as those used in tournaments. One dohyō is standard, although some larger stables have built two.

Dohyō matsuri
After the dohyō has been built, a ceremony called the dohyō matsuri (ring ceremony) is held. The dohyō matsuri is said to have been introduced by Yoshida Zenzaemon sometime during the Edo period. The  was a prominent gyōji family.

The ceremony is done to purify and consecrate the dohyō, while also inviting the kami (Shinto deities) down to watch sumo. The ceremony is led by one of the tategyōji (head referee) along with two other gyōji. The gyōji take the place of Shinto priests. The tategyoji will pray for the safety and well-being of the wrestlers. In the middle of the dohyō a square hole is cut in where the tategyoji will then place inside: torreya nuts, dried chestnuts, salt, washed rice, dried squid or cuttlefish and kombu (seaweed). The tategyoji will then will pour sacred sake into the hole, and around several other places around the dohyō before he will put more clay into the hole. The yobidashi will eventually cover up the hole. The sacred sake is then shared with everyone in attendance.

To conclude the ceremony the yobidashi in a procession with taiko drums called a fure-daiko will begin. The procession will go around the dohyō three times before leaving the proceeding out into the street to announce the beginning of the tournament.

At the end of the tournament one gyōji is thrown into the air by the low ranking wrestlers as a way of sending off the kami and officially ending the tournament.

Image gallery

See also

Dohyō-iri
Clay court

References

Shinto architecture
Japanese words and phrases
Sumo terminology
Sumo venues in Japan
Martial arts equipment